Marc Gual Huguet (born 13 March 1996) is a Spanish professional footballer who plays as a forward for Polish club Jagiellonia Białystok. He is also under contract with Ukrainian club Dnipro-1, but that contract is suspended.

Club career

Espanyol
Born in Badalona, Barcelona, Catalonia, Gual represented CF Badalona and FC Barcelona as a youth before joining RCD Espanyol's youth categories in 2013. He made his debut for the reserves on 4 October 2015, starting in a 1–1 home draw against Valencia CF Mestalla in the Segunda División B.

Gual scored his first goal as a senior on 3 January 2016, his team's first in a 2–2 away draw against Villarreal CF B. On 12 March, he scored a brace in a 4–0 home routing of CD Olímpic de Xàtiva.

Sevilla
On 9 November 2016, Gual signed a three-year contract with another reserve team, Sevilla Atlético in Segunda División, mainly as a replacement to injured Carlos Fernández and Maryan Shved. He made his professional debut ten days later, starting and scoring his team's second in a 2–2 away draw against RCD Mallorca.  Gual scored a brace in a 2–3 away loss against Elche CF on 9 April, and  a week later, he scored a hat-trick in a 6–2 home rout of Real Valladolid to take his tally up to eight.

Gual was loaned to fellow second division side Real Zaragoza, for one year, on 9 August 2018. On 28 June of the following year, he joined freshly relegated side Girona FC also in a temporary deal.

On 30 January 2020, Gual moved to Real Madrid Castilla on loan for the remainder of the season. On 1 September, he agreed to a permanent two-year contract with AD Alcorcón in the second division.

Dnipro
Gual terminated his contract with Alkor on 7 January 2022. He then signed with Ukrainian Premier League club SC Dnipro-1 on a deal until the summer of 2024. Only 42 days on from his signing, and before the resumption of the Ukrainian season after the winter break, the league was suspended due to the Russian invasion and he escaped the country.

FIFA suspended the contracts of all foreign players and coaches affiliated with the Ukrainian Association of Football on 7 March 2022. Sixteen days later, Gual returned to Eastern Europe, joining Polish Ekstraklasa side Jagiellonia Białystok until the end of the season. On his debut on 3 April, he scored the winner in the seventh minute of added time in a 2–1 home victory over Zagłębie Lubin. On 28 June, his loan was extended for another year.

References

External links

1996 births
Living people
People from Badalona
Sportspeople from the Province of Barcelona
Spanish footballers
Spanish expatriate footballers
Footballers from Catalonia
Association football forwards
Segunda División players
Segunda División B players
Ekstraklasa players
RCD Espanyol B footballers
Sevilla Atlético players
Real Zaragoza players
Girona FC players
Real Madrid Castilla footballers
AD Alcorcón footballers
SC Dnipro-1 players
Jagiellonia Białystok players
Spanish expatriate sportspeople in Ukraine
Spanish expatriate sportspeople in Poland
Expatriate footballers in Ukraine
Expatriate footballers in Poland
Spain under-21 international footballers